Caryle Murphy is an American journalist. Her awards include the Pulitzer Prize.

Working life
Murphy has worked in America as a reporter for The Washington Post and for The Christian Science Monitor. She has worked for the GlobalPost and The National while in Saudi Arabia.  As a foreign correspondent for The Washington Post, she reported in the following regions: South Africa (following the Soweto uprising and Steve Biko slaying by the police); Cairo as bureau chief, in charge of Arab world coverage; and Kuwait during border crossing and subsequent Emirate occupation by Iraqi forces. She was part of team covering the Gulf War from Southern Arabia, and she was a reporter for three months during a tour of duty in Baghdad.

In terms of her work in America, she is on top of coverage in the following areas: American immigration policy, American federal court in Alexandria, Virginia, and religion.

She has also been a public policy scholar at the Woodrow Wilson International Center for Scholars in Washington, DC.

Murphy is probably best known for her coverage of Iraqi-occupied Kuwait and the Gulf War (1990–91) that ensued.

Recognition
Murphy was the 1994–1995 Edward R. Murrow Fellow at the Council on Foreign Relations in New York. In 2002, in the Washington Post's Book World she was described by Emran Qureshi, as having engaged in "careful reporting and cogent analysis [that] present[ed] readers with an indispensable opportunity to understand how the variegated strands of Islam – tolerant reformist traditions as well as militant anti-Western ones – have taken root in the Arab world's most vital civilization."

Publications
Murphy has written two books: Passion for Islam: Shaping the Modern Middle East: The Egyptian Experience, and A Kingdom's Future: Saudi Arabia Through the Eyes of its Twentysomethings (illustrated by Kathy Buttefield).

Awards
Murphy has received many awards including:
The George Polk Award for Foreign Reporting (1990)
The Courage in Journalism Award from the International Women's Media Foundation (1990)
Pulitzer Prize for International Reporting (1991)
Edward Weintal Diplomatic Reporting Prize (1991)
The Robert F. Kennedy Journalism Award (1994)
Knight Luce Fellowship for Reporting on Global Religion (2011)

Personal life
Murphy grew up in Massachusetts. She graduated Trinity University in Washington, D.C., and Johns Hopkins University's School of Advanced International Studies.

References

External links

Year of birth missing (living people)
Living people
American women journalists
Pulitzer Prize winners for journalism
Pulitzer Prize for International Reporting winners
Paul H. Nitze School of Advanced International Studies alumni
Trinity Washington University alumni
The Washington Post people
The Christian Science Monitor people
21st-century American women